Recaro Holding, as the parent company of the Recaro Group, owns the Recaro brand and the independently operating companies Recaro Aircraft Seating (aircraft seats) based in Schwäbisch Hall and Recaro eGaming (gaming seats) based in Stuttgart, Germany. The business areas Recaro Automotive Seating and Recaro Kids are operated by licensees.

History

The company was founded on 1 October 1906 by Wilhelm Reutter as Stuttgarter Carosserie und Radfabrik. In 1909 Wilhelm's brother Albert Reutter joins the company as a partner and commercial manager. Change of name to "Stuttgarter Karosseriewerk Reutter & Co.", owner W. & A. Reutter. On 24 July 1909 the patent for a "folding roof with canopy, especially for motor vehicles" was filed. This so-called "reform body" was a constructive forerunner of the convertible. The result was bodies including interior fittings for almost all well-known manufacturers of the time, in particular Daimler-Benz (and predecessor) as well as the Chemnitzer Wanderer-Werke. In 1919, the gradual conversion from individual production to mass production took place.  During the 1920s the company became known for building limousine bodies. 1930 Reutter entered into a partnership with the Porsche design office. From 1931 Reutter manufactured the first bodies for Porsche types 7, 8, 9, 12 and 32. 1936 After the capacity limit of the main plant in Augustenstraße had been reached, a second plant was built in Zuffenhausen. A year later in 1937 Reutter receiveed the order to produce the Volkswagen prototype pre-series VW 303. A couple years later in 1939 the company had around 900 employees. 1944 the main factory in Augustenstraße was severely damaged in an air raid. The workforce shrunk to 94 people. In 1949 Porsche began engaging the company to build their Porsche 356 sports car bodies.

In 1953, the company registered a patent for "a hinge fitting for upholstered seats with adjustable backrest", the Reutter reclining seat fitting. 1954 Completion of the 5,000th body for the Porsche 356. In 1956 the "Stuttgarter Karosseriewerk Reutter & Co. GmbH" celebrates its 50th anniversary. In the same year the 10,000th Porsche body, left the factory, which by then employed 900 people.

In 1963, Porsche acquired the car body factory. What remained was renamed to Recaro (REutter-CAROsserie), and focus was shifted to high-end seats. The company began producing both OEM seats for Porsche, and a separate line of after-market seats. In 1965, Recaro presented the first Recaro sports seat at the Frankfurt Motor Show. In 1967, Recaro started the construction of a production facility in Schwäbisch Hall. In 1969, the Reutter family sold the company to three companies, Keiper, Huber & Wagner and Metzeler, due to economic problems. In 1971, Recaro produced the first aircraft seats under the name Recaro Aircomfort under license of the American manufacturer Hardman Aerospace. Shortly afterwards, Recaro launched its first aircraft seat, the so-called Recaro 2020, and sold it to Lufthansa, among others. In 1974, the first motorsport seat was based on the Recaro professional full shell seat. In 1983, Keiper purchased all shares in Recaro and established Keiper Recaro in Kirchheim.

After restructuring in 1997, Recaro became an independent company again. This resulted in four legally and economically independent companies, including Recaro Aircraft Seating GmbH & Co. KG. A year later, in 1998, Recaro introduced the first ever-growing child seat. In 2004, Recaro bought the traditional company "Storchenmühle", which concentrates on the production of child seats. In 2006, the company celebrated its 100th anniversary . In June 2011, Recaro sold the automotive seating division to Johnson Controls, a U.S.-based automotive supplier. The acquisition granted Johnson Controls to be a licensee of the RECARO brand in the automotive industry, as well as the exclusive, unlimited right to market Recaro seats for cars and commercial vehicles. All other brand companies now belong to RECARO Group Stuttgart, which is the brand owner and licensor of RECARO Automotive Seating.

In 2013, after restructuring, Recaro Holding relocated its registered office back to Stuttgart, Germany. After it spun off from Johnson Controls in 2016, Recaro Automotive Seating is now owned by automotive supplier Adient. The Recaro Group continues to act as licensor. In 2018, Recaro Child Safety ceased business operations (including Storchenmühle), and Recaro Holding entered into a global licensing agreement with Artsana Group, which, following the cessation of Recaro Child Safety's operations (including Storchenmühle), will continue to develop, manufacture, and distribute premium child seats and strollers under the Recaro Kids brand name. Also in 2018, Recaro established a division called Recaro eGaming, which markets gaming chairs. In 2019, Recaro Gaming Seats became available for purchase.

Recaro Group 
The Recaro Group comprises the divisions Recaro Aircraft Seating, Recaro eGaming and Recaro Holding itself.

Recaro Holding 
Recaro Holding acts as the holding company of the Recaro Group and comprises the areas of strategy, finance, human resources and law as well as design, brand, communication and innovation management. The headquarter of Recaro Holding has been located in Stuttgart since May 2013.

Recaro Aircraft Seating 
Recaro Aircraft Seating is a developer and manufacturer of aircraft seats. The Aircraft seat production began in 1971 under license under the name Recaro Aircomfort, initially in Stuttgart. From 1983 the entire production takes place in Schwäbisch Hall. Recaro Aircraft Seating GmbH & Co. KG also has production plants in Poland, South Africa, the USA and China in addition to its headquarter in Schwäbisch Hall. 

In 2004, Recaro Aircraft Seating took over the majority of AAT Composites in South Africa - a company that manufactures products for the aviation industry from fibre composites.

Recaro Gaming 
Since the beginning of 2018, Recaro Gaming GmbH & Co. KG, based in Stuttgart, has been part of the Recaro Group. With the founding of this new company, Recaro is positioning itself as a supplier for premium gaming seats in the rapidly growing eSports and gaming market. The company presents the first gaming seat prototype at Gamescom 2018 in Cologne.

Recaro as Licensor

Recaro Automotive Seating 
The Recaro Automotive Seating division, a manufacturer of car seats, was sold to US automotive supplier Johnson Controls in 2011. In 2016, Recaro Automotive Seating evolved to ownership under automotive supplier Adient following the spin-off from Johnson Controls. In 2020, Adient sold RECARO Automotive to a privately held entity and is headquartered in Clinton Township, MI, USA. The world’s leading automotive seating brand, RECARO Automotive, specializes in creating innovation, safety, comfort, and quality in automotive seating. 500 employees operating in 3 assembly plants in 3 countries (United States, Germany and Japan) worldwide producing and delivering premium quality automotive products by using the brand RECARO under a license of the RECARO Holding. From complete seating systems to individual components, expertise spans every step of the automotive seat-making process. Globally integrated, in-house skills support product creation from research and design all the way to engineering and manufacturing while maintaining a global premium brand presence. To learn more, please visit www.RECARO-automotive.com

Recaro Kids 
The Recaro Child Safety GmbH & Co. KG, headquartered in Marktleugast, which merged with the long-established Storchenmühle company in 2004, ended its business operations on 31 July 2018. At the end of October 2018, Recaro Holding and Artsana Group signed a global license agreement. The agreement covers the development, production and distribution of premium children's seats and prams under the Recaro Kids brand name.

Literature 
 Frank Jung: Porsche 356 - made by Reutter. Delius Klasing, Bielefeld 2011, .
 Uta & Helmut Jung: Stuttgarter Karosseriewerk Reutter ‒ von der Reform-Karosserie zum Porsche 356. Delius Klasing, Bielefeld 2006, .
Frank Jung: RECARO: Seating in Motion. Delius Klasing, 2016, .

References

External links
 

Auto parts suppliers of Germany
Aircraft component manufacturers
Seats
Airliner seating
Automotive motorsports and performance companies
Manufacturing companies based in Stuttgart
Manufacturing companies established in 1906
1906 establishments in Germany